Dipterocarpus caudiferus is a species of tree in the family Dipterocarpaceae, endemic to Borneo. Its habitat is mixed dipterocarp forests up to  elevation. Dipterocarpus caudiferus is threatened mainly by conversion of land for palm oil plantations.

References

caudiferus
Endemic flora of Borneo
Taxa named by Elmer Drew Merrill
Plants described in 1926